James Henry McCourt was a member of the Wisconsin State Assembly.

Biography
McCourt was born on October 26, 1846, in Clinton County, New York. His places of residence would include St. Croix Falls, Wisconsin, Taylors Falls, Minnesota and Sequim, Washington. McCourt died on December 22, 1923.

Career
McCourt was a member of the Assembly during the 1887 and 1889 sessions. He served as a Republican. Additionally, he was President (similar to Mayor) of St. Croix Falls and Postmaster of Sequim.

References

External links

Geni.com

People from Clinton County, New York
People from St. Croix Falls, Wisconsin
People from Chisago County, Minnesota
People from Sequim, Washington
Republican Party members of the Wisconsin State Assembly
Mayors of places in Wisconsin
Washington (state) postmasters
1846 births
1923 deaths
Burials in Washington (state)